Sherab Zam (10 October 1983) is a Bhutanese archer. She competed at the 2012 Summer Olympics at the Women's individual event. Also, she was selected to be Bhutan's flag-bearer at the 2012 Summer Olympics.

She is coached by Tshering Chhoden who competed in the 2000 and 2004 Olympics in the archery competition. The duo trained for several weeks in the Netherlands, as part of a Dutch-Bhutanese exchange program.

In the 2012 Olympic archery competition, Sherab was ranked 61st (out of 64 competitors). She was subsequently eliminated in the 1/32 round, in which she was beaten 0-6 by US archer Khatuna Lorig.

Member of National Team since June 2005 till January 2014.

Assistant Coach since January 2014.

References

External links
 
 Profile
 Yahoo sport profile

Bhutanese female archers
Olympic archers of Bhutan
1983 births
Archers at the 2012 Summer Olympics
Living people
People from Dagana District